A straitjacket is a garment shaped like a jacket with long sleeves that surpass the tips of the wearer's fingers. Its most typical use is restraining people who may cause harm to themselves or others. Once the wearer slides their arms into the sleeves, the person restraining the wearer crosses the sleeves against the chest and ties the ends of the sleeves to the back of the jacket, ensuring the arms are close to the chest with as little movement as possible.

Although straitjacket is the most common spelling, strait-jacket is also frequent. Straitjackets are also called camisoles.

The effect of a straitjacket as a restraint makes it of special interest in escapology. The straitjacket is also a staple prop in stage magic.

The straitjacket comes from the Georgian era of medicine. Physical restraint was used both as treatment for mental illness and to pacify patients in understaffed asylums.

Due to their strength, canvas and duck cloth are the most common materials for institutional straitjackets.

History

The word "strait", in this context, means "confinement". 
The straitjacket is described as early as 1772, in a book by the Irish physician David Macbride, though there are claims an upholsterer named Guilleret invented it in 1790 France for Bicêtre Hospital. (See the French Wikipedia article, Camisole de force.)

Before the development of psychiatric medications and talking therapy, doctors did not know how to treat mental disorders such as schizophrenia, depression, and anxiety disorders. They attempted treatments that are cruel by modern standards, and the straitjacket was one of them. At the height of its use, doctors considered it more humane than restraints of ropes or chains. It prevented the patient from damaging clothes or furniture, and from injuring self, staff, or fellow inmates.

Before the American Civil War, the mentally ill were often in poorhouses, workhouses, or prisons when their families could no longer care for them. Patients were forced to live with criminals and treated likewise: locked in a cell or even chained to walls. By the 1860s, Americans wanted to provide better assistance to the less fortunate, including the mentally ill. The number of facilities devoted to the care of people with mental disorders saw a dramatic increase. These facilities, meant to be places of refuge, were called insane asylums. Between 1825 and 1865, the number of asylums in the United States increased from nine to sixty-two.

The establishment of asylums did not mean treatment improved. Because doctors did not understand what caused the behavior of their patients, they often listed the possible causes of mental illness as religious excitement, sunstroke, or even reading novels . They believed the patient had lost all control over their morals and strict discipline was necessary to help the patient regain self-control. Asylums often employed straitjackets to restrain patients who could not control themselves.

Many assessors, including Marie Ragone and Diane Fenex, considered straitjackets humane, gentler than prison chains. The restraint seemed to apply little to no pressure to the body or limbs and did not cause skin abrasions. Moreover, straitjackets allowed some freedom of movement. Unlike patients anchored to a chair or bed by straps or handcuffs, those in straitjackets could walk. Some registered nurse specialists even recommended restrained individuals stroll outdoors, thereby reaping the benefits of both control and fresh air.

Despite its popular consideration as humane, straitjackets were misused. Over time, asylums filled with patients and lacked adequate staff to provide proper care. The attendants were often ill-trained to work with the mentally ill and resorted to restraints to maintain order and calm. In fact, during the late nineteenth and early twentieth centuries, some prisons even used straitjackets to punish or torture inmates.

Modified variants of the garment are still in use. A particular brand of straitjacket is called an "Argentino" suit, manufactured by PSP Argentino Inc. In Canada in 2015, there was a class action lawsuit that won over the misuse of the restraint.

Security

The security of a straitjacket depends very much on its size, which should be as small as practicable to be secure. A tight jacket at the chest and armpits will make it difficult for the wearer to pull the arms out of the sleeves.

The sleeves of the jacket are sewn shut at the ends—a significant restraint in itself because it restrains the use of the hands. The arms are folded across the front, with the ends of the sleeves wrapping around to fasten or tie behind the back. On some jackets, the sleeve-ends are anchored to the garment to allow the fastening or knot to rotate away from the wearer's hands as they move their arms, making it more difficult to undo. Some straitjackets are designed to have the person's arms crossed behind them rather than in front to ensure further restraint.

Most jackets feature a crotch-strap to prevent wearers from pulling off the jacket. Some bear loops at the front and/or sides; the sleeves are threaded through these to prevent the arms from being raised over the head. Friction buckles are used to fasten institutional jackets with webbing or cloth straps because they are difficult to open without a free pair of hands.

In stage magic, gimmicked jackets, made for magicians who practice escape stunts, omit arm loops, fasten with simpler buckles, and/or leave hidden openings in the sleeves.

Safety
Wearing an institutional straitjacket for long periods of time may cause pain for wearers. Blood pools in the elbows, causing swelling. The hands may become numb from lack of proper circulation. Bone and muscle stiffness causes the upper arms and shoulders to experience pain. Many wearers in these situations attempt to move and stretch their arms by thrashing around in their jackets, which is why institutions take great precautions, such as monitoring patients and conforming to strict protocols, when outfitting people in straitjackets.

Escape techniques
To remove a straitjacket with both back and crotch-straps, it is not necessary to be able to dislocate one's shoulders in order to gain the slack necessary to pull an arm out of the sleeves. The necessity of this ability was fictitiously created by Harry Houdini and his brother Hardeen to try to lessen the amount of competition. Houdini later in his career published his technical handling of the escape in a newspaper. Escape artists around the world commonly continue this rumor to "spice up" the escape. Without dislocating the shoulder, it is sometimes possible to get more room by pulling at the inside of the arms as they are being strapped or by keeping an elbow held outward to gain slack in the sleeves when the arm is relaxed. Another way to gain slack is to take and hold a deep breath while the jacket is being done up.

It is possible for one person to put a willing volunteer into a straitjacket, but it generally takes at least two people to straitjacket a struggling person. 
For a jacket without a front strap, the most common way to escape is to hoist the arms over the head before undoing the crotch strap and at last the strap at the back of the neck.  This allows the jacket to simply be peeled off upward over the head. The straitjacket escape was popularized by Houdini, who "discovered" it. Houdini first did it behind a curtain, forcing the audience to listen to thumps while watching a billowing curtain for many minutes. He found the trick went over better when the audience could see his struggles.  In a few of his later and more popular acts, he performed the straitjacket escape while hung upside down from a crane, and also did the same when placed in a sealed milk can which was filled. Houdini's (and many other illusionists) acts showed the straitjacket in action in a variety of ways.

World records

Fastest regulated Posey straitjacket escape
The official "Fastest Escape from a Regulated Posey Straitjacket" is 2.84 seconds, set by Danilo Audiello at the Studio Fleming Medicina Generale, Foggia, Italy, on 11 August 2014.

Other speed/difficult straitjacket escape records and attempts
Straitjacket escape is one of the most sensational and famous magicians' tricks; it was a staple in illusionist Harry Houdini's act. Thus, new world records for straitjacket escape are constantly being attempted, in various ways and with various degrees of difficulty added.  Some of the more newsworthy attempts and successes include:

On Mindfreak, Criss Angel set a world record when he escaped from two straitjackets at once while hanging from a crane over Bourbon Street in New Orleans.
On the 1980s weekly television show Dick Clark's Live Wednesday, Steve "Mr. Escape" Baker successfully escaped from two straitjackets while hanging upside down over the stage.  His first attempt ended in a minor muscle injury; however, he repeated the stunt and was successful.
On September 27, 2003, James Peters (UK) escaped from a Posey straitjacket 193 times in eight hours at YMCA Chelmsford, in Essex.
On January 8, 2005, at the Arndale Centre, Manchester UK, David Straitjacket set the Guinness World Record for the fastest straitjacket escape in a time of 81.24 seconds.
On June 19, 2005, Ben Bradshaw from Australia performed a Posey straitjacket escape using four backstraps, an arm loop, a crotch strap, arm straps and self-tightening clasps. He managed to escape in a time of 50.08 seconds on the Guinness World Records studio in Sydney, beating the previous 81.24-second record by David Straitjacket.
On August 5, 2006, Michal Angelo set a new record by escaping from a regulation straitjacket while being fully submerged under water in a time of 29.1 seconds, beating the previous 38.59 second record by Ben Bradshaw.
Jonathan Edmiston "Danger Nate" set a new Guinness World Record for "Fastest Straitjacket Escape" using a Posey straitjacket with the front arm loop, side arm loops, and pelvic strap in a time of 20.72 seconds on July 4, 2007, at the Independence Day Celebration on the US Naval Base in Yokosuka, Japan.
Matt the Knife set a new Guinness World Record for "Fastest Escape from a Straitjacket" using a Posey straitjacket with the front arm loop, side arm loops, and pelvic strap in a time of 18.8 seconds on September 17, 2007, at The Media Hotel in Beijing, China.
On October 8, 2007, American Cliff Gerstman escaped from a straitjacket while floating in zero gravity. The escape was performed in an airplane flown by Zero G Inc. and sponsored by Northrop Grumman. This was the world's first zero gravity straitjacket escape and took 40 seconds to complete.
On September 4, 2010, on the Fox News channel show Fox & Friends, Alexanderia the Great set a record for an extreme straitjacket escape.  She escaped a regulation straitjacket secured with 50 feet of 1/4 inch chain and 10 padlocks in 2:37.  The Universal Records Database officiated over the record.
On October 8, 2011, illusionist Lucas Wilson set a new Guinness World Record for fastest escape from a Posey straitjacket and chains, while in suspension. Lucas time was 19.2 seconds beating the previous record of 54.24 seconds.
On March 6, 2011, Roslyn Walker became the first person to escape from a regulation Posey straitjacket complete with front and side loops and have his arms secured behind his back during the Secret Escape Challenge meeting in Essex. It took him 14 minutes and 27 seconds to free himself.
 On January 9, 2013, UK female escape artist Sofia Romero, also known as Sof Strait, set a new Guinness World Record for most straitjacket escapes in one hour. She escaped from a regulated Posey straitjacket 49 times consecutively on the set of Officially Amazing (Lion TV) at The Old Vic Tunnels in London, UK.
 On July 23, 2013, Alexanderia the Great performed an underwater straitjacket escape in a small bullet-proof clear tank in full view for America's Got Talent, live on stage at Radio City Music Hall. Billed as a combination of two of Houdini's greatest escapes (The Straitjacket and The Milk Can or Water Cell escapes), Alexanderia was put into a regulation Houdini straitjacket, with five leather straps including a crotch strap. The straitjacket was then secured with an additional 25 feet of 1/4-inch steel chain. A padlock was secured each time the chains were wrapped around her body and arms, resulting in a total of five padlocks. Alexanderia then went into a small (3x3) clear bullet-proof (Lexan) tank filled with water. The lid to the tank was padlocked shut, forcing her underwater with no way to breathe. Unlike any of Houdini's Milk Can or Water Cell escapes, no curtains were used to hide the method of escape.

References
Citations

Sources
 Wiktionary: 1870 citation for straightjacket/camisole
 Chris Fowler, Stars and Stripes. July 4, 2007. Sailor to mark holiday by wiggling out a straitjacket record . Retrieved on 26 March 2008.
 Chris Fowler, Stars and Stripes. August 15, 2007. It's official: Sailor sets a Guinness world record . Retrieved on 26 March 2008.

External links
 
 

Jackets
Psychiatric restraint
Physical restraint